The Karting Italian Championship is a kart racing series based in Italy. Until 2010 it was called Italian Open Masters.

Champions

Formula A/KF1

Intercontinental A/KF2

Intercontinental A Junior/KF3/KFJ/OKJ

Intercontinental C/KZ2

Intercontinental 60 Mini

References

External links
 CAMPIONATO ITALIANO ACI KARTING OFFICIAL WEBSITE

Kart racing series